Lily-Rose Melody Depp (born 27 May 1999) is a French-American actress and model. Depp began her acting career with a small role in Tusk (2014), and went on to star in the period drama The Dancer (2016), in which she played Isadora Duncan; Planetarium (2016); and The King (2019). Depp has been nominated for César Awards for Most Promising Actress for her performances in The Dancer and A Faithful Man (2018). Since 2015, she has been a Chanel brand ambassador.

Early life 
Lily-Rose Melody Depp was born in Neuilly-sur-Seine, France, west of Paris, on 27 May 1999. She is the daughter of the American actor, producer, and musician Johnny Depp and the French singer, actress, and model Vanessa Paradis. Depp has a younger brother, Jack (John Christopher Depp III). The French actress Alysson Paradis is her aunt. Depp claims to have Native American ancestry through her father.

In 2012, after 14 years together, Depp's parents separated and arranged joint custody of Depp, who divides her time between Los Angeles, Paris, and New York City.

Career

2014–present: Career beginnings

Depp began her acting career with a cameo role in Tusk, which premiered at the Toronto International Film Festival in September 2014. She acted alongside her friend Harley Quinn Smith, her father, and the film's director Kevin Smith.

In 2015, Depp appeared with the Irish rapper Rejjie Snow in his music video "All Around the World", which was released in October. In addition to film work, Depp appeared on the cover of various fashion magazines, and has been the Chanel brand ambassador since 2015. She was chosen by Karl Lagerfeld when she was 15 years old. In 2016, Depp was announced by Lagerfeld as the face of Chanel's iconic fragrance, Chanel No. 5 L'Eau.

Depp reprised her Tusk role in Yoga Hosers, a spin-off that focuses on her and Harley Quinn Smith's characters. The film premiered at the Sundance Film Festival in January 2016.

In May 2016, The Dancer, in which Depp plays Isadora Duncan, premiered at the Cannes Film Festival in the Un Certain Regard category. The film is Stéphanie Di Giusto's directorial debut. For her performance in the film, Depp was nominated for Most Promising Actress at the 42nd César Awards and Most Promising Actress at the 22nd Lumières Awards. In the same year, Depp and Natalie Portman co-starred in Rebecca Zlotowski's Planetarium as two spiritualist sisters in 1930s France. It was Portman who picked Depp to play her younger sister in the film. The film had its premiere at the Venice Film Festival in September 2016.

In 2018, Depp starred opposite Laurent Lafitte in Les Fauves (Savage), a French film directed by Vincent Mariette. The film was premiered in France in October 2018. In the same year, Depp starred in A Faithful Man, directed by Louis Garrel and co-written by Oscar winner Jean-Claude Carrière. The film was premiered at the Toronto International Film Festival in September and released in France in December 2018. It had its U.S. debut at the New York Film Festival, and was released in New York and Los Angeles in July 2019. She was once again nominated for Most Promising Actress at the 44th César Awards.

Depp next appeared in the Netflix short documentary Period. End of Sentence. with Priyanka Chopra explaining how The Pad Project helped the women in Delhi start their own business making sanitary pads. The documentary won Academy Award for Best Documentary (Short Subject) at the 91st Academy Awards. It was distributed by Netflix in February 2019. In April 2019, Depp was nominated for Most Promising Actress at Romy Schneider Award.

In June 2019, Depp starred alongside her aunt Alysson Paradis in the French independent short film Quel Joli Temps Pour Jouer Ses Vingt-ans (My Last Lullaby), in which Depp played Paloma, a girl who experiences a great loss of a grandfather. The film won Best Picture at the 2019 New York Film Awards, and Best Narrative Short at the 2019 Los Angeles Film Awards. Mor Cohen of the New York Film Awards wrote, "Great performances by all actors, led by Lily-Rose Depp, who were so nuanced and intuitive that it was hard to remember these are fictional characters and not real people". For her performance in My Last Lullaby, Depp won best actress award at the 2019 Los Angeles Film Awards. Les Brandt for the Los Angeles Film Awards noted, "Depp displays sonic waves of artistic expression with her eyes and internal work that was so subtle yet massively powerful and at such a young age was an exciting thing to watch."

Depp next starred in The King, in which she plays Catherine of Valois, opposite Timothée Chalamet as Henry V. It had its world premiere at the Venice Film Festival in September 2019 and has been distributed by Netflix since November 2019. Owen Gleiberman of Variety wrote, "Lily-Rose Depp makes her presence felt, for perhaps the first time ever, as Catherine of Valois, whose delicate worldliness matches Henry’s", and Rory O'Connor for The Film Stage called it "an excellent cameo".

In 2021, Depp starred in the opioid crisis thriller Crisis alongside Gary Oldman, Armie Hammer, and Evangeline Lilly, and also in Neil Burger's sci-fi thriller Voyagers alongside Colin Farrell, Tye Sheridan, Isaac Hempstead Wright, and Fionn Whitehead. She appeared in a Christmas comedy Silent Night with Keira Knightley and Roman Griffin Davis among the cast. Depp starred alongside George MacKay in Nathalie Biancheri's Wolf.

Depp is set to reprise her Tusk and Yoga Hosers role in Moose Jaws. She will be making her television debut in the upcoming HBO drama series The Idol, where she will star alongside recording artist Abel 'The Weeknd' Tesfaye. Depp will also have two upcoming movie projects including A24's erotic drama The Governesses and Robert Eggers’ gothic horror Nosferatu.

Personal life 
Depp is the goddaughter of novelist François-Marie Banier and singer Marilyn Manson. Since her birth, Depp has been the subject of tabloid and media reporting, including birthdays, attendance at society events, and reviews of her fashion choices. She is fluent in both English and French, and has both French and US citizenship. Depp dropped out of high school in 2016 to focus on her acting career. She has struggled with anorexia in the past and has since recovered.

In August 2015, Depp posed for iO Tillett Wright's Self-Evident Truths Project, stating she falls somewhere "on the LGBTQA spectrum". Depp later clarified she was simply making a statement on defining oneself, and not on her own sexuality.

In 2016, although Depp was then under the legal voting age, she supported Bernie Sanders during the 2016 Democratic Party presidential primaries. Depp and her mother Vanessa Paradis were photographed for Our City of Angels magazine in February 2017; the sales proceeds for the issue were donated to Planned Parenthood.

Depp allegedly dated Timothée Chalamet from 2018 to 2020.

Filmography

Film

Television

Music videos

Discography

Awards and nominations

References

External links 
 
 

Living people
1999 births
21st-century American actresses
21st-century French actresses
Actresses from Paris
American child actresses
American female models
American people of French descent
American people of English descent
American people of German descent
American people of Irish descent
American people who self-identify as being of Native American descent
Female models from California
French child actresses
French emigrants to the United States
French female models
French people of American descent
French people of English descent
French people of German descent
French people of Irish descent
Johnny Depp
People from Neuilly-sur-Seine